Boy Kemper (born 21 June 1999) is a Dutch professional footballer who plays as a defender for ADO Den Haag.

Club career
Kemper made his Eerste Divisie debut for Jong Ajax on 18 August 2017 in a game against SC Cambuur.

Honours

Club
Jong Ajax
Eerste Divisie: 2017–18

References

External links
 
 
 Career stats & Profile - Voetbal International

1999 births
People from Purmerend
Living people
Dutch footballers
Netherlands youth international footballers
Jong Ajax players
ADO Den Haag players
Eredivisie players
Eerste Divisie players
Association football defenders
Footballers from North Holland